This is a list of descendants of Edmund Rice, a noted colonial settler.

In 1638, Rice immigrated to the Massachusetts Bay Colony with his kin, where he became a founder of both Sudbury, Massachusetts, and Marlborough, Massachusetts.

A
 Géraldine Margit Virginia Olga Mária Apponyi de Nagyappony (1915–2002), Queen of Albania 
 Desiderio Alberto Arnaz IV (born 1953), actor and musician, son of Lucille Ball and Desi Arnaz
 Lucie Désirée Arnaz (born 1951), entertainer and producer; daughter of actors Lucille Ball and Desi Arnaz

B
 Frederick Henry Ball (1915–2007), movie studio executive, actor, and brother of comedian Lucille Ball.
 Lucille Désirée Ball (1911–1989), actress, comedian, television personality, and studio executive Desilu Productions
 Donald Clinton Barton (1889–1939), geophysicist and pioneering petroleum geologist
 George Hunt Barton (1852–1933), geologist, educator, explorer of Greenland with Robert E. Peary 
 Asa Brigham (1788–1844), signer of Texas Declaration of Independence, Texas treasurer, Austin mayor
 Carl Campbell Brigham (1890–1943), controversial pioneer of psychometrics, known for creating the Scholastic Aptitude Test
 Elbert Sidney Brigham (1877–1962), U.S. Congressman from Vermont
 Elijah Brigham (1751–1816), Massachusetts state representative and state senator; U.S. Congressman from Massachusetts.
 Mary Ann Brigham (1829–1889), American educator and 8th President (President Elect) of Mount Holyoke College
 Robert Breck Brigham (1826–1900), philanthropist endowing the Robert Breck Brigham Hospital in Boston.
 Joseph Emerson Brown (1821–1894), Governor of Georgia during the U.S. Civil War and U.S. Senator from Georgia
 Joseph Mackey Brown (1851–1932), Two non-consecutive term governor of Georgia implicated in the lynching of Leo Frank; son of Joseph E. Brown
 Catharinus Putnam Buckingham (1808–1888), professor of mathematics and brigadier general in Union Army; grandson of Rufus Putnam
 Edgar Rice Burroughs (1875–1950), author and creator of the Tarzan character
 John Coleman Burroughs (1913–1979), book illustrator and son of Edgar Rice Burroughs

C
 Paul Rice Camp (1919–2012), physicist, academic, and Chief of Materials Research at CRREL
 Miriam C. Camps (1916–1994), economist, author, and State Department official
 George Rice Carpenter (1863–1909), educator and literary scholar
 Margaret Seymour Carpenter (1893–1987), author of the novel Experiment Perilous 
 Herman Churchill (1869–1941), educator, genealogist and historian
 Charles Colson (1931–2012), Director of the Office of Public Liaison
 Calvin Coolidge (1872–1933), Thirtieth President of the United States
 Charles Austin Coolidge (1844–1926), Brigadier General
 John Coolidge (1906–2000), businessman and philanthropist from Plymouth Notch, Vermont, and son of President Coolidge

D
 Matthew Paige Damon (born 1970), American actor
 Dorothea Lynde Dix (1802–1887), health care and social reformer
 Allen Stuart Drury (1918–1998), journalist, and winner of the 1960 Pulitzer Prize for Fiction for his novel Advise and Consent
 Alexander Greer Drury (1844–1929), physician, medical educator and medical historian
 Asa Drury (1801–1870), educator and Baptist minister best known as an antebellum abolitionist
 Thomas Drury (1668–1723), Massachusetts colonial legislator

E
 Alexander Rice Esty (1826–1881), 19th-century New England architect
 Constantine Canaris Esty (1824–1912), state representative, state senator and U.S. Congressman from Massachusetts.

G
 Robert Grant (1852–1940), American novelist and probate judge in Massachusetts.

H
 Erastus Otis Haven (1820–1881), Methodist bishop, Massachusetts state senator, and president of three major universities
 John James Hollister, Jr.  (1901–1961) California state senator and grandson of William Welles Hollister
 William Welles Hollister (1818–1886) a California rancher and entrepreneur, namesake of Hollister, California
 Arthur Otis Howe (1871–1951), Vermont state representative and senator 
 Elias Howe (1819–1867), inventor of the first practical sewing machine
 Frank Edmund Howe (1870–1953), Vermont state legislator, House speaker, and Vermont lieutenant governor 
 Gardner Howe (1759–1854), Vermont state legislator
 Gilman Bigelow Howe (1850–1933), genealogist and president of the National Genealogical Society
 Jonas Howe (1786–1865), Massachusetts state legislator
 Jonas Holland Howe (1821–1898), abolitionist, artist, and Minnesota state legislator
 Marshall Otis Howe (1832–1919), Vermont state legislator
 Simon Herbert Howe (1835–1911), businessman, Massachusetts state legislator and first mayor of Marlborough
 Levi Hubbard (1762–1836), Massachusetts state legislator, U.S. Congressman from Massachusetts (Maine District)

I
 Charles Phillip Ingalls (1836–1902), American pioneer whose life was depicted in the Little House books
 James Harvey Irvine (1867–1947), prominent landowner in Orange County, California; Irvine Ranch

K
 Charles Reuben Keyes (1871–1951), educator, archaeologist and German scholar
 Margaret Naumann Keyes (1918–2015), educator and heritage conservation scholar
 David Sjodahl King (1917–2009), U.S. Congressman from Utah, ambassador
 William Henry King (1863–1949), U.S. Congressman and Senator from Utah

L
 Rose Wilder Lane (1886–1968), writer, political theorist & co-founder of the modern American libertarian movement
 Walter Franklin Lansil (1846–1925), Boston based American artist known for scenes of Venice
 Wilbur Henry Lansil (1855–1897), Boston based American artist and younger brother of Walter Franklin Lansil.
 Mary Ashton (Rice) Livermore (1820–1905), American abolitionist, social activist, and author.

M
Walter Ralston Martin (1928–1989), Baptist Christian minister and author
 Catherine Ann Keyes Miller (1905–1978), music historian, archivist, and educator
 Dwight Lyman Moody (1837-1899), Evangelist and founder of Moody Church

O
 Josephine King Olsen (born 1942), 20th Director of the Peace Corps.
 Culbert Levy Olson (1876–1962), California governor 1939–1943; first cousin to U.S. Senator William H. King

P
 Frank Charles Partridge (1861–1943), lawyer, diplomat, and U.S. Senator from Vermont
 William Lyon Phelps (1865–1945), author, radio program host, professor of English literature at Yale University
 Orlando Brunson Potter (1823–1894). businessman, U.S. Congressman from New York
 Persis (Rice) Putnam (1737–1820), wife of U.S. Revolutionary War general Rufus Putnam.

R
 Abbott Barnes Rice (1862–1926), businessman and Massachusetts state legislator
 Alexander Hamilton Rice (1818–1895), industrialist, Boston mayor, Massachusetts governor, and U.S. Congressman
 Alexander Hamilton Rice, Jr. (1875–1956), physician, geographer and explorer
 Alexandrea Kawisenhawe Rice (born 1972), contemporary Canadian actress from the Kahnawake Mohawk nation
 Americus Vespucius Rice (1835–1904), banker, brigadier general, U.S. Congressman from Ohio
 Andrew Eliot Rice (1922–2010), American political scientist, founder of Peace Corps and the Society for International Development
 Arthur Wallace Rice (1869–1938), architect from Boston and partner in Parker, Thomas & Rice
 Caleb Rice (1792–1873), attorney; first president of Massachusetts Mutual Life Insurance Company and mayor of Springfield, Massachusetts
 Charles Rice (1787–1863), brigadier general of the Massachusetts Militia and state representative
 Charles Allen Thorndike Rice (1851–1889), publisher, editor and journalist
 Charles Francis Rice (1851–1927), Methodist minister, author
 Edmund Rice (1819–1889), U.S. Congressman from Minnesota
 Edmund Rice (1842–1906), brigadier general and Medal of Honor awardee
 Edward Everett Rice (1847–1924), composer and musical theater producer
 Edward Hyde Rice (1847–1895), American educator from Massachusetts
 Edward Loranus Rice (1871–1960), biologist and university administrator
 Eustace Bond Rice (1871–1938) professor of music theory at New England Conservatory
 Franklin Pierce Rice (1852–1919), publisher, historian and antiquarian
 George Merrick Rice (1808–1894), businessman, steel industry pioneer, Massachusetts state senator
 George Walter Rice (1855–1884), pioneering Canadian photographer and arctic explorer
 George Washington Rice (1823–1856), businessman and founder of Massachusetts Mutual Life Insurance Company
 Harvey Rice (1800–1891), lawyer, publisher, author and Ohio state legislator
 Henry Rice (1786–1867), U.S. military officer, merchant and Massachusetts state legislator
 Henry Mower Rice (1816–1894), U.S. Senator from Minnesota, prominent in its statehood
 Horace Jacobs Rice (1882–1964), Massachusetts lawyer and law school administrator
 Ingraham "Gitz" Rice (1891-1947), Canadian military officer and musical entertainer
 Jacob Rice (1787–1879), New Hampshire state legislator
 James Clay Rice (1828–1864), educator, lawyer and brigadier general
 James Stephen Rice (1846–1939), businessman, rancher & early resident of Tustin, California
 Joel Taylor Rice (aka Joel Ryce-Menuhin), (1933–1998) pianist and Jungian psychologist
 John Asaph Rice (1829–1888), prominent Chicago hotelier & book collector, father of Wallace Rice
 John Richard Rice (1895–1980), Baptist evangelist and pastor.
 Jonas Rice (1672–1753), grandson of Edmund; first permanent English American settler and founder of Worcester, Massachusetts
 Joseph Rice (1638–1711), son of Edmund, Member of the Massachusetts General Court in 1683 and 1698
 Joseph Waldo Rice (1828–1915), American-born entrepreneur and early settler of Barmah, Victoria, Australia.
 Kathleen Creighton Starr Rice (1882–1963), Math professor; trapper; homesteader; first female gold prospector in the Canadian North.
 Lawrence Bridges Rice (1898–1992), architect and tennis champion
 Leon Scott Rice (born 1958), Lieutenant General, U.S. Air Force; Director of Air National Guard and formerly The Adjutant General (TAG) of the Massachusetts National Guard
 Laura North Rice (1920–2004), psychology professor, author 
 Lilian Jeannette Rice (1889–1938), architect from San Diego 
 Luther Rice (1783–1836), Baptist minister, missionary to India, and educator; founder of George Washington University
 Michael Alan Rice (born 1955), biologist, Rhode Island state legislator
 Ora Ray Rice (1885–1966), dentist, Wisconsin state legislator, Speaker of the Wisconsin State Assembly 1951–54 
 Paul North Rice (1888–1967), librarian, reference department director of the New York Public Library
 Percy Fitch Rice (1882–1954), inventor and businessman
 Richard Henry Rice (1863–1922), mechanical engineer and inventor
 Robert Vernon Rice (1924-2020), biochemist and educator
 Rosella Rice (1827-1888), American author contributing to the folklore of John "Johnny Appleseed" Chapman.
 Thomas Rice (1654–1747), grandson of Edmund; Massachusetts colonial legislator and a founder of Westborough, Massachusetts
 Thomas Rice (1734–1812), Massachusetts state legislator, judge, Federalist Party politician
 Thomas Rice (1768–1854), Massachusetts state legislator, U.S. Congressman from Massachusetts (Maine district)
 Victor Moreau Rice (1818–1869), New York State legislator, educator, newspaperman, banker and insurance company executive.
 Wallace deGroot Cecil Rice (1859–1939), author, poet and designer of the Chicago flag
 Willard Wadsworth Rice (1895–1967), silver medalist U.S. hockey player in the 1924 Winter Olympics
 William Abbott Rice (1912–1991), geologist and university professor
 William Rice (1788–1863), Massachusetts businessman and public servant
 William Rice (1821–1897), Methodist minister, librarian
 William Ball Rice (1840–1909), industrialist and president of  Rice & Hutchins, Inc.
 William Chauncey Rice (1878–1941), American lawyer, prominent Methodist and editor of Zion's Herald
 William Gorham Rice, Jr. (1892–1979) law professor at University of Wisconsin–Madison
 William Gorham Rice, Sr. (1856–1945) American government official from Albany, New York
 William North Rice (1845–1928), geologist, Methodist minister and university administrator
 William Whitney Rice (1826–1896), U.S. Congressman from Massachusetts
 George Edmund Royce (1829–1903), businessman and state senator from Vermont

S
 Joan Irvine Smith (1933–2019), businesswoman and philanthropist prominent in Orange County, California.

T
 James Vernon Taylor (born 1948), American singer and songwriter.

U
 William Upham (1791–1853), Vermont state legislator and U.S. Senator from Vermont

W
 Gideon Welles (1802–1878), Secretary of the Navy during the Lincoln and Andrew Johnson administrations.
 Almanzo James Wilder (1857–1949), husband of writer Laura Ingalls Wilder and father of writer Rose Wilder Lane
 Laura Ingalls Wilder (1867–1957), author of Little House on the Prairie

Z
 Leka Zogu (1939–2011), Crown Prince of Albania
 Leka Zogu II (b. 1982), pretender to Albanian throne

References

Descendants of individuals
American families of English ancestry